Robert Hecht-Nielsen (July 18, 1947 - May 25, 2019) was an American computer scientist, neuroscientist, entrepreneur and professor of electrical and computer engineering at the University of California, San Diego.  He co-founded HNC Software Inc. (NASDAQ: HNCS) in 1986 which went on to develop the pervasive card fraud detection system, Falcon®. He became a vice president of R&D at Fair Isaac Corporation when it acquired the company in 2002.

Artificial Neural Networks 
As a pioneer in the field of artificial neural networks, he authored the first textbook on the subject, Neurocomputing, in 1989. Hecht-Nielsen was awarded the INNS Gabor Award and INNS Neural Networks Pioneer Award for his significant contributions to the field. He was among the core group of researchers who proved that neural networks are universal function approximators.

Confabulation Theory 
In March, 2005, he held an event to announce "the fundamental mechanism of cognition" dubbed Confabulation Theory, which he believes is a process of confabulation (neural networks).  He posits that all actions and thoughts begin as the "winners" of competitions, where confabulations are tested for cogency based on antecedent support.  He presented some mathematical models of the proposed mechanism, and some experimental results where software using this system was able to add several words to a stub of a sentence, keeping that stub coherent and, optionally, maintaining some connection to a full input sentence supplied as context.

For example, given "But the other ..." the program returns "But the other semifinal match between fourth-seeded ...".  Given "Japan manufactures many consumer products." for context, and the same three-word stub, it returns "But the other executives included well-known companies ...".  Five pages of such examples were given.

He made red, green, and blue-striped medallions to commemorate the event, and had them distributed to the audience along with pamphlets explaining their significance:  "This new era, which as yet has no name, will be characterized by the eternal universal freedom from want provided by intelligent machines."

References

External links 
 UCSD site, with video
 UCSD faculty biography
 
 May/June 2007 Fair Isaac "Viewpoints" article
 
 In memory of Robert Hecht-Nielsen, an influential neuroscientist, entrepreneur and UC San Diego professor

2019 deaths
American computer scientists
Artificial intelligence researchers
University of California, San Diego faculty
1947 births
Arizona State University alumni